The British Graham Land expedition (BGLE) was a geophysical and exploration expedition to Graham Land in Antarctica between 1934 and 1937. Under the leadership of John Rymill, the expedition spent two years in the Antarctic. The expedition determined that Graham Land was a peninsula. The expedition used a combination of traditional and modern practices in Antarctic exploration, using both dog teams and motor sledges as well as a single-engine de Havilland Fox Moth aircraft for exploration. Transportation to the Antarctic was in an elderly three-masted sailing ship christened the Penola, which had an unreliable auxiliary engine. Additional supplies were brought on the ship Discovery II.

The expedition was one of the last privately sponsored Antarctic missions, with only part of the cost covered by the UK government. Although the expedition had a very small budget, it was successful in its scientific objectives. Air survey photography and mapping was carried out for 1000 miles (1600 km) of the Graham Land coast.

All sixteen members of the landing party received the Polar Medal. The participants of the BGLE included:
 Duncan Carse who transferred onto the expedition ship at the Falkland Islands
 Launcelot Fleming who later became Bishop of Portsmouth and later the Bishop of Norwich
 Dr. Brian Birley Roberts, who later contributed to the drafting of the Antarctic Treaty
 Edward W. Bingham, in charge of the expedition's sled dogs
 Quintin Riley
 Robert Ryder, who captained the Penola and later won the Victoria Cross in the St Nazaire Raid

See also
 List of Antarctic expeditions
 Noel Atherton
 Discovery Investigations

References

Further reading

External links
Scott Polar Research Institute website - detailed description of the expedition
Freezeframe website - photographs from the expedition
Internet Archive - BGLE Scientific Report vol 1 published by British Museum (Natural History)

1934 in the United Kingdom
1934 in Antarctica
1935 in Antarctica
1936 in Antarctica
1937 in Antarctica
Antarctic expeditions
United Kingdom and the Antarctic
Graham Land
Expeditions from the United Kingdom